Kirani (Aymara kira stick for the roof; rope, -ni a suffix, Hispanicized spelling  Quirane) is a mountain in the Andes of Peru, about  high. It is located in the Puno Region, Lampa Province, Paratia District. Kirani lies northeast of Yanawara, east of Ananta Lake.

References

Mountains of Peru
Mountains of Puno Region